Chesterfield Parish Church is an Anglican church dedicated to Saint Mary and All Saints, in Chesterfield, Derbyshire, England. Building of the church began in 1234 AD, though the present church dates predominantly from the 14th century. Designated a Grade I listed building in 1971, St Mary's is best known for its twisted and leaning spire (known as the Crooked Spire). It is the largest parish church in the Diocese of Derby, and forms part of the Archdeaconry of Chesterfield. In 1994, it also became the UK's only representative in the Association of the Twisted Spires of Europe; of the 72 member churches, it is deemed to have the greatest lean and twist.

History
Evidence of a Christian church on the site dates to the Anglo-Saxon era; a font thought to date from 890 to 1050 AD can be seen in the south transept of the current church. There is mention of the 'Church in Chesterfield' during the 11th-century reign of Edward the Confessor, and historians believe there was also a Norman church. Construction on the present church started in 1234 AD. It was continued and expanded throughout the medieval period, particularly in the 14th century. 
The church is largely medieval, with Early English, Decorated Gothic and Perpendicular Gothic features built of ashlar. It is laid out in a classic cruciform and comprises a nave, aisles, north and south transepts and the chancel which is surrounded by four guild chapels.

During the Reformation in the 1500s, the church lost much of its medieval decor. It was rebuilt in the 1700s, including of the north transept in 1769, and restored and embellished by Neo-Gothic architect George Gilbert Scott in the 1840s. A new ceiling was installed and new east window inserted with stained glass by William Wailes of Newcastle. A new font was donated by Samuel Johnson of Somersal Hall. After a nine-month closure, the church reopened on 9 May 1843.

In 1810, a peal of 10 bells was installed in the steeple underneath the spire, which could be heard up to four miles away, in a quieter age.  In 1817, an inspection concluded that loose and rotting timber inside the spire, and the structure being pushed southward from inner support beams, meant the structure was in imminent danger of collapse, and it was recommended that the entire spire be dismantled for safety. However, it was decided the spire could instead be repaired.

On 11 March 1861, the church spire was struck by lightning, damaging gas lighting pipes in the steeple and igniting a beam next to the wooden roof of the chancel. The fire smouldered for three and a half hours until it was discovered by the sexton on his nightly round to ring the midnight bell.

A further restoration was begun in 1896 by Temple Lushington Moore. Moore designed the High Altar reredos, installed in 1898.

In 1911, it was reported that the custom of ringing a 'Prentice bell – an old Angelus bell, used but once a year – was still rung from the Crooked Spire every Shrove Tuesday at a quarter to eleven as a pancake bell.

A further fire erupted on 22 December 1961, this time engulfing the north of the church. A clerk at the town library noticed smoke from the north transept window and raised the alarm, enabling firefighters to save much of the historic church, including the south transept screen from  1500, the Norman font and a Jacobean pulpit – but the flames melted the glass in the north window and destroyed the roof, the choir room, and the majority of a rare 1756 John Snetzler pipe organ. In 1963, a replacement organ was installed, a 1905 T.C. Lewis organ sourced from Glasgow City Hall, incorporating what remained of the 18th-century Snetzler with a couple of tonal additions since.

In 1984, to mark the church's 750th anniversary, new stained-glass windows depicting the town's history from the 11th century onward were installed in the south aisle, a gift from the people of Chesterfield. Preservation and restoration work on the older stained glass was carried out from 2007 to 2012.

In 2000, scientists were asked to evaluate the spire's movement which, although not considered a threat to the structure, had apparently accelerated during the previous two decades.

In 2020, the Church was awarded a 'lifeline grant' from the Culture Recovery Fund to help ensure its continued role as a place of worship, and as a tourist attraction for the area, during the COVID-19 pandemic in the United Kingdom.

Crooked spire

The reason is uncertain and still debated: suggestions include lack of skilled workers because of the Black Death, which occurred as much of the church was being built; the use of insufficient cross bracing and 'green timber' – unseasoned timber; and also the 17th-century addition of 33 tons of lead sheeting covering the spire, resting on 14th-century bracing not designed to carry such weight. Another theory is sunlight heating the south side of the tower and causing the lead there to expand at a greater rate than the north side, resulting in an unequal expansion. It is possible that the spire's twist is due to a combination of these factors. 

The golden cockerel weather vane atop the spire is inscribed with the names of the past vicars of St Mary's.

The steeple below the spire contains 10 bells, in the key of D. There is also an eleventh 'Shriving' or 'Curfew Bell'. During the early 1800s, Chesterfield was a base for the holding of Napoleonic soldiers on parole; they were allowed a two-mile radius to roam on condition they return to barracks at the ringing of the curfew bell. The present set of bells were cast in 1947 by the Whitechapel Bell Foundry in London, the heaviest weighing . The place in which the bells are now housed once held a builders' windlass, which survives as one of the few examples of a medieval crane in existence, and the only one from a parish church. It is on display at Chesterfield Museum and Art Gallery. 

The Church's twisted spire gave the town's football club Chesterfield F.C. their nickname, The Spireites. A depiction of the spire also features on the club's crest. It has also been used by local companies to advertise their wares, including Scarsdale Brewery of Chesterfield who used the spire in their logo, from 1866 until a takeover by Whitbread in 1958. 

There are local folk legends as to why the spire is twisted, mostly involving the Devil. In one, a Bolsover blacksmith mis-shod a hoof of the devil, who leapt over the spire in pain and angrily kicked it out of shape. Another states that the devil was resting on the spire when the smell of incense wafting up from inside the church made the devil sneeze, so violently that it caused the spire to warp. A similar story has the devil flying from Nottingham to Sheffield and stopping for rest atop the church, its tail wrapped around the spire, but the ringing of the church bells startled the devil and on leaping away its lashing tail twisted the spire. A simpler version has the devil merely sitting spitefully atop the church weather vane, its bulk causing the twisted spire and inadvertently creating a new tourist attraction. Another myth suggests that the spire, so captivated by the beauty of a bride, leant down for a closer view but became locked in a twisted position, while the more mocking version has the church being so surprised to see a virgin being married, whether groom or bride, that its spire turned to look at the betrothed, becoming stuck – but that should another virgin ever marry in the church, the spire will return to true again.

Tours
The spire is open to the public, via organised tours and can be climbed partway up. The views from the top of the tower on a clear day stretch for miles. The spire, which is used as a symbol of Chesterfield, can be seen from the surrounding hills jutting from a sea of mist, on a winter morning.

Vicars

Organ
The vast majority of the original John Snetzler organ (1756) was destroyed by fire in 1961. It was replaced in 1963 by a redundant T. C. Lewis organ from Glasgow. This is a large four-manual pipe organ with 65 stops. A specification of the organ can be found on the National Pipe Organ Register.

List of organists

See also
Grade I listed churches in Derbyshire
Listed buildings in Chesterfield, Derbyshire

Gallery

References

External links

 Parish Church of St Mary and All Saints
 Derbyshire churches — Church of Our Lady and All Saints at Chesterfield

Church of England church buildings in Derbyshire
Grade I listed churches in Derbyshire
Church of Saint Mary And All Saints
Towers completed in the 14th century
Inclined towers
Tourist attractions of the Peak District
Twisted buildings and structures